London Levi Fletcher-Baker (born May 19, 1975) is a former American football linebacker who played in the National Football League (NFL) for 16 seasons with the St. Louis Rams, Buffalo Bills, and Washington Redskins. He played college football at John Carroll and signed with Rams as an undrafted free agent in 1998. After four seasons with the Rams, he was a member of the Bills for five seasons and spent his last seven seasons with the Redskins. He made four Pro Bowls during his Redskins tenure and won a Super Bowl title with the Rams in Super Bowl XXXIV.

Fletcher was recognized for never missing a game in his career, being one of only five players in NFL history to play in over 250 consecutive games and holding the record for consecutive starts at the linebacker position. He finished his career with 215 consecutive games started, which ties him for seventh all-time along with Alan Page and Ronde Barber. He was named to the Washington Ring of Fame in 2019 and joined their radio broadcast crew in 2022.

High school years
Fletcher attended Villa Angela-St. Joseph High School in Cleveland, Ohio, and won varsity letters in football and basketball. He played on two state championship basketball teams.

College years
While attending John Carroll University, Fletcher played both basketball and football for the John Carroll Blue Streaks. As a senior, he had 202 tackles (a school-record) and was named the Division III National Linebacker of the Year. Fletcher also attended Saint Francis University of Pennsylvania before transferring to John Carroll University. He was on the men's basketball team while at Saint Francis.

Professional career
Fletcher attended the NFL Scouting Combine and ran a 4.38 in the 40-yard dash. He worked out for several NFL teams and was expected to be a day 2 selection, but was not one of the 30 linebackers drafted during the 1998 NFL Draft.

Fletcher was known by his nickname - dot.com - because he was 'always online with the other team.'

St. Louis Rams

1998
On April 28, 1998, the St. Louis Rams signed Fletcher to a one-year, $158,000 contract as an undrafted free agent.
He made his professional regular season debut in the St. Louis Rams’ season-opening 24–17 loss against the New Orleans Saints. On December 27, 1998, Fletcher earned his first career start after Eric Hill sustained an injury. He made eight solo tackles on defense and seven special teams tackles as the Rams lost 38–19 at the San Francisco 49ers in a Week 17. Fletcher earned the Rams Rookie of the Year Award. He finished the season with 14 combined tackles (11 solo) in 16 games and one start.

1999
Throughout training camp, Fletcher competed against Charlie Clemons and Lorenzo Styles to be the starting middle linebacker after the Rams chose not to re-sign Eric Hill. Head coach Dick Vermeil named Fletcher the starting middle linebacker to begin the regular season, alongside outside linebacker Todd Collins and Mike Jones.

On October 3, 1999, Fletcher collected a season-high 11 combined tackles (nine solo) and made his first career sack during a 38–10 win at the Cincinnati Bengals in Week 3. Fletcher sacked Bengals’ quarterback Jeff Blake for a ten-yard loss during the third quarter. In Week 9, Fletcher recorded five combined tackles and earned his first career safety during a 31–27 loss at the Detroit Lions. Fletcher earned his safety after tackling running back Greg Hill in the endzone for a one-yard loss during the first quarter. Fletcher started in all 16 games in 1999 and recorded a total of 138 tackles on defense and special teams combined. His 138 tackles were the most by a Ram since Roman Phifer collected 149 tackles in the 1995. Fletcher recorded 90 combined tackles (66 solo), with three sacks, and one safety on defense.

The St. Louis Rams finished first in the NFC West with a 13–3 record and earned a first round bye. On January 16, 2000, Fletcher started in his first career playoff game and recorded 11 combined tackles (eight solo) and made one sack during a 49–37 victory against the Minnesota Vikings in the NFC Divisional Round. The following week, he made nine combined tackles as the Rams defeated the Tampa Bay Buccaneers 11–6 in the NFC Championship Game. On January 30, 2000, Fletcher started in Super Bowl XXXIV and recorded 11 combined tackles (nine solo) as the Rams defeated the Tennessee Titans 23–16. He also was named to the All-Madden team and as a second alternate to the Pro Bowl for the first time.

2000
On February 2, 2000, St. Louis Rams’ head coach Dick Vermeil announced his decision to retire. The St. Louis Rams promoted offensive coordinator Mike Martz to head coach. Martz retained Fletcher, Collins, and Jones as the starting linebackers. He started in the St. Louis Rams’ against the Denver Broncos and collected a season-high 14 combined tackles (nine solo) and made two sacks during their 41–36 victory. On November 12, 2000, Fletcher made six solo tackles, forced a fumble, and made his first career interception during a 38–24 at the New York Giants in Week 11. Fletcher intercepted a pass by Giants’ Kerry Collins, that was intended for wide receiver Ike Hilliard, and returned it for a 12-yard gain during the third quarter. In Week 13, Fletcher recorded seven combined tackles, was credited with half a sack, and made a season-high two interceptions during a 31–24 loss against the New Orleans Saints. He made both interceptions off pass attempts by Saints’ quarterback Aaron Brooks. In Week 15, he recorded ten combined tackles (nine solo) and two sacks during a 40–29 victory against the Minnesota Vikings. His performance earned him NFC Defensive Player of the Week honors. He led the team with 193 tackles on defense and special teams, eclipsing the old franchise mark of 185 set by LB Jim Collins in 1984. Fletcher recorded 132 combined tackles (105 solo) solely  on defense and made four interceptions and 5.5 sacks in 16 games and 15 starts.

2001
In 2001, Fletcher earned NFC Defensive Player of the Week honors twice and was an alternate to the pro bowl for the third straight season. In a game against the San Francisco 49ers on September 23, he led the team with a career-high 21 tackles, 15 solo. The second time was after his big performance against the New England Patriots on November 18 as he led the team with 17 tackles with one pass deflection. He forced a fumble on the Rams’ three-yard line that led to a 97-yard scoring drive to end the first half and intercepted a Tom Brady pass with 5:18 left in the third quarter for an 18-yard return. This season, the Rams made the Super Bowl XXXVI but were defeated by the Patriots 20–17, after kicker Adam Vinatieri made a game-winning 48-yard field goal as time expired.

Buffalo Bills
On March 6, 2002, the Buffalo Bills signed Fletcher to a five-year, $17.12 million contract that includes a signing bonus of $4 million.

Starting in 2002, Fletcher started all 16 regular season games for the Bills until his last season in 2006, when he recorded a team-high 157 tackles, including nine for loss, set a career-high with 14 deflections and tied a career-high with four interceptions. On September 10, in the first regular season game, Fletcher scored his first career touchdown after recovering a fumble by the Patriots' Tom Brady and returning it five yards for a touchdown only 12 seconds into the game. Fletcher was named a 2007 Pro Bowl alternate in his last season as a member of the Bills.

Washington Redskins

On March 2, 2007, Fletcher signed with the Washington Redskins to a five-year, $25 million contract. He immediately became the team's starting middle linebacker. With his first season on the team, he was named co-winner of the B.J. Blanchard Award, an honor given annually to a Redskins player who best helps the local media do their jobs, along with quarterback Jason Campbell. Fletcher continued his Pro Bowl-caliber run with the Redskins in 2008.

He was the Redskins' defensive co-captain for the team from 2008 season until he retired. Also in 2008, the Redskins nominated Fletcher as their Walter Payton Man of the Year Award representative.

Fletcher was named to the NFC squad in the 2010 Pro Bowl after Jonathan Vilma's New Orleans Saints qualified for Super Bowl XLIV, the first Pro Bowl selection in his career. Fletcher was also one of three candidates for the 2009 Walter Payton Man of the Year Award, which was ultimately won by the Kansas City Chiefs's Brian Waters.

After the Redskins' switch to a 3–4 defensive scheme, Fletcher moved from the middle linebacker position to the left inside linebacker for the 2010 season. He made the Pro Bowl for the second consecutive time in 2010, where he had an interception which set up a touchdown for the NFC.

Despite not making the 2012 Pro Bowl starting roster, Fletcher led the entire league in tackles with 166 tackles by the end of the 2011 season. He started all 16 games of the 2011 season and recorded 166 combined tackles, 1.5 sacks, two interceptions, and eight pass breakups. Fletcher, however, did make it as alternate for the 2012 Pro Bowl along with teammates, Brian Orakpo and Lorenzo Alexander. On January 9, 2012, Fletcher was added to the NFC 2012 Pro Bowl roster after Brian Urlacher confirmed that he would not be participating.
On January 11, 2012, it was announced that Fletcher won the Bart Starr Award. He was also named the Redskins' 2011 Defensive Player of the Year.

On April 13, 2012, Fletcher was re-signed by the Redskins to a two-year contract worth $10.75 million with $5.25 million guaranteed. He was given the 87th ranking in the NFL Network's Top 100 Players of 2012 list. Despite the Redskins' 31–28 loss to the St. Louis Rams in Week 2 of the 2012 season, Fletcher had a stellar performance. In the game, he intercepted quarterback Sam Bradford in the endzone and forced running back Daryl Richardson to fumble in the fourth quarter and the ball was recovered by DeAngelo Hall, which gave the Redskins one last attempt to tie or win the game. In the Week 12 win against the Dallas Cowboys on Thanksgiving, he recorded his second interception for the season making him one of three active NFL players, at that time, to have recorded 20 interceptions and 30 sacks, the other two being Brian Urlacher and Ray Lewis.
Fletcher intercepted Joe Flacco in Week 14 against the Baltimore Ravens. He had another interception, against Brandon Weeden, in the Redskins' win over the Cleveland Browns. He finished the season with 139 tackles, three sacks, and a career-high five interceptions.

There was doubt over whether Fletcher would return for the 2013 season until it was announced that he had surgery on his left ankle and was scheduled for elbow surgery to prepare for another season with the Redskins on March 6, 2013. On November 7, Fletcher started his 208th consecutive game, tying the league's all-time record of most starts by a linebacker last held by retired linebacker Derrick Brooks.

Retirement
On December 18, 2013, Fletcher announced his retirement. Fletcher finished his career having played in 256 consecutive games and starting 215 consecutive games, which is the NFL all-time record of consecutive starts at the linebacker position. He joined Washington's radio broadcast crew in 2022. On September 1, 2022, Fletcher was inducted into Washington's Greatest Players list in honor of the franchise's 90th anniversary.

Career awards and highlights
 Super Bowl champion (XXXIV)
 4× Pro Bowl selection (2009–2012)
 2× second-team All-Pro selection (2011, 2012)
 NFL combined tackles leader (2011)
 Bart Starr Man of the Year Award (2012)
 Redskins Ring of Fame (2019)

NFL career statistics

Regular season

Postseason

Personal life
Fletcher and his wife Charne have three children, two daughters, Paige and Brooke, and a son, Steele.

Fletcher is a Christian. Fletcher spoke about his conversion to Christianity saying, "I spent years chasing things I thought would bring me everlasting joy and happiness: chasing Super Bowl rings or a multi-million dollar contract; or a new house, cars and jewelry. None of those things did for me what Christ did in an instant."

Fletcher was named a Pro Bowl alternate 11 times during his career and did not play in his first one until the 2010 Pro Bowl via replacing Jonathan Vilma. As a result, Fletcher called himself the NFL version of Susan Lucci, who won a Daytime Emmy after 19 nominations.

References

External links

ESPN Profile

1975 births
Living people
American football middle linebackers
Washington Redskins players
Buffalo Bills players
St. Louis Rams players
Saint Francis University alumni
John Carroll Blue Streaks football players
Players of American football from Cleveland
African-American players of American football
National Conference Pro Bowl players
21st-century African-American sportspeople
20th-century African-American sportspeople
Washington Commanders announcers